The Revision of Laws Act 1968, is a Malaysian laws which enacted to provide for the revision and reprinting of laws and subsidiary legislation.

Structure
The Revision of Laws Act 1968, in its current form (1 August 2008), consists of 18 sections and no schedule (including 4 amendments), without separate Part.
 Section 1: Short title
 Section 2: Interpretation
 Section 3: Appointment of Commissioner
 Section 4: Appointment of Committee
 Section 5: Printing of revised laws
 Section 6: Powers of the Commissioner
 Section 7: Method of compiling a revised law
 Section 8: Examination by the Committee
 Section 9: Revised law to comply with Committee's opinion
 Section 10: Publication of revised law
 Section 11: Completion of revision of pre-1969 laws to be notified in Gazette
 Section 12: Saving of existing subsidiary legislation
 Section 13: Revision of subsidiary legislation
 Section 14: Reprint of laws
 Section 14A: Publication volume by volume
 Section 14B: Updating of reprints
 Section 14C: Delegation of powers
 Section 15: Rectification of formal errors
 Section 16: Reference to number of line in any law
 Section 17: Place of this Act in the Laws of Malaysia series
 Section 18: Repeal

References

External links
 Revision of Laws Act 1968 

1968 in Malaysian law
Malaysian federal legislation